Zieba or Zięba (literally finch) is a Polish-language surname. Notable people with the surname include:
Barbara Zięba (born 1952), Polish gymnast
 (born 1972), Polish badminton player
Ludwik Zięba (born 1953), Polish biathlete
Maciej Zięba (born 1987), Polish-German footballer
Marzena Zięba (born 1987), Polish Paralympic powerlifter
Nadieżda Zięba (born 1984), Polish badminton player

See also
 
 Ziemba, alternative spelling

Polish-language surnames

Surnames from nicknames